The 2017–18 Richmond Spiders men's basketball team represented the University of Richmond during the 2017–18 NCAA Division I men's basketball season. They were led by 13th-year head coach Chris Mooney and played their home games at the Robins Center Richmond as members of the Atlantic 10 Conference. They finished the season 12–20, 9–9 in A-10 play to finish in a four-way tie for fifth place. As the No. 7 seed in the A-10 tournament, they defeated Duquesne in the second round before losing to St. Bonaventure in the quarterfinals.

Previous season
The Spiders finished the 2016–17 season 19–11, 13–5 in A-10 play to finish in a tie for third place in the conference. They defeated George Washington in the quarterfinals of the A-10 tournament before losing to VCU in the semifinals. They received an invitation to the National Invitation Tournament, where they defeated Alabama and Oakland before falling to TCU in the quarterfinals.

Offseason

Departures

2017 recruiting class

Future recruits

2018 recruiting class

Preseason 
In a poll of the league’s head coaches and select media members at the conference's media day, the Spiders were picked to finish in eighth place in the A-10. De’Monte Buckingham was named to the conference's preseason second team.

Roster

Schedule and results

|-
!colspan=9 style=| Non-conference regular season

|-
!colspan=12 style=| A-10 regular season

|-
!colspan=9 style=| A-10 tournament

Source:

References

Richmond Spiders men's basketball seasons
Richmond
Richmond Spiders men's basketball
Richmond